The Ministry of Education is a government department of Ethiopia, focusing in the governance and policies of education. It is headquartered in Arada Sub-City, Addis Ababa. It is responsible for overseeing the teaching and learning process throughout the country from elementary school education to higher secondary school education. It regulates the general curriculum of public schools and also sets the precedent for private schools. In addition the ministry is the responsible for the Ethiopian National Exams. The department  also has, in accord with Ethiopian law, the authority to regulate all institutions of learning to a certain limited extent.

History
The Ministry of Education established during the reign of Emperor Haile Selassie in 1930 under Blattengetta Sahlu Sedalu, a former graduate of the Menelik II School. The First Secretary of the Ministry was Ato Kidina Mariam Aberra. The Ministry was then allotted 2 per cent of the treasury's revenue, in addition to a special education tax.

On 6 October 2021, the Ministry of Science and Higher Education (MoSHE) was dissolved and merged to MoE, which was established two years prior on 16 August 2018.

References

External links
 Ethiopian Ministry of Education
 Ethiopian Ministry of Education 

Government of Ethiopia
Education ministries
Government ministries of Ethiopia